Sosnowice may refer to the following places:
Sosnowice, Lesser Poland Voivodeship (south Poland)
Sosnowice, Masovian Voivodeship (east-central Poland)
Sosnowice, Goleniów County in West Pomeranian Voivodeship (north-west Poland)
Sosnowice, Kamień County in West Pomeranian Voivodeship (north-west Poland)

See also
Sosnowiec (disambiguation)